"Another Way" is a song by American R&B singer Tevin Campbell. It was written by Teddy "Sonny Boy" Turpin, Terrell Carter, and Marc Kinchen for his self-titled fourth studio album (1999) with production helmed by the latter. Released as the album's lead single, the song reached the top thirty of the New Zealand Singles Chart, peaking at number 28. It was the only single from Tevin Campbell to reach the US Billboard Hot 100, peaking at number 100.  "Another Way" had more success on the Billboard R&B chart, where it peaked at number 25.

Music video
An accompanying music video for "Another Way" was filmed by director Darren Grant in Los Angeles, California during the week of October 31, 1998.

Track listings

Notes
 denotes additional producer

Credits and personnel
Credits lifted from the liner notes of Tevin Campbell.

Jay Brown – executive producer
Tevin Campbell – executive producer, vocals
Terrell Carter – arranger
Stevie J – executive producer

Quincy Jones – executive producer
Marc Kinchen – lyrics, producer
Marc D. Persaud – co-executive producer

Charts

References

1998 songs
1999 singles
Qwest Records singles
Tevin Campbell songs
Songs written by Marc Kinchen